Chairman of the Soviet of Nationalities was the presiding officer of the upper chamber of the Supreme Soviet of the Soviet Union.

Source:

Chairman of the Soviet of the Republics

See also
List of Chairmen of the Soviet of the Union

References

Government of the Soviet Union
Soviet Union, Soviet of the Nationalities, Chairmen
Politics of the Soviet Union

Supreme Soviet of the Soviet Union